Negative is the 13th studio album by a Japanese singer-songwriter Yōsui Inoue, released in December 1987.

Track listing
All songs written and composed by Yōsui Inoue

Side one
"Negative" – 3:46
"Moon" – 3:14
"" – 2:59
"" – 4:26
"" – 5:41

Side two
"Seventeen" – 3:25
"" – 3:52
"" – 3:33
"Why" – 5:32
"Love You" – 2:51

Personnel
Shūichi "Ponta" Murakami – Drums
Yūji Tanaka – Drums
Kenji Takamizu – Bass
Chiharu Mikuzuki – Bass
Haruyoshi Rokudo – Bass
Kenji Ōmura – Guitar
Yutaka Takesawa – Guitar
Wataru Yahagi – Guitar
Nobuyuki Shimizu – Guitar, synthesizer
Yasuharu Nakanishi – Keyboards
Yūji Kawashima – Keyboards, synthesizer
Takeshi Kobayashi – Synthesizer
Eiji Mori – Synthesizer
Motoya Hamaguchi – Percussion
Katō Strings – Strings
Aska Strings – Strings
Seri Ishikawa – Chorus
Yōsui Inoue – Lead and backing vocals, guitar

Chart positions

References

1987 albums
Yōsui Inoue albums